The following page is a full list of power stations in Hungary that are at least 50 MW in capacity. The list is based on information from the Hungarian grid operator MAVIR. Plants that were permanently shut down are excluded.

Details on the Paks Nuclear Plant 
 Paks - 4 VVER 440 MWe reactors

See also 

Energy policy of the European Union
 List of power stations in Europe
 List of largest power stations in the world

References

Hungary, List of power stations in
power stations in Hungary, List of